Thomas Joseph Rozdilsky (born March 15, 1983), better known as TJR, is an American DJ and music producer.

Background 
Thomas Joseph Rozdilsky was born in Danbury, Connecticut. Hesitating between a golfing career or music, TJR decided to become a DJ in 2004 after attending multiple acid house concerts. TJR has built a catalogue of original tracks and remixes since arriving on the scene in 2008. He is known for the hits "Ode to Oi" and the certified platinum "Don't Stop the Party" with Pitbull.

Discography

Singles 
 
2005
 "Time Bomb"
 "Introducing the Acid OG's" (Artists collaborating: Terry Mulan and Kevin Ford)
 "Old Skool"
 "The Language of Acid!" (Various artists collaborating)

2006
 "System on Blast"

2007
 "Natural Causes"
 "Catalyst Sampler 4.0" (Various artists collaborating)

2008
 "Bass Is the Place"

2009
 "Eat, Breathe, Sleep"
 "Trick Baby" (Hot Mouth collaborates in this song)
 "Move This World"

2010
 "All I Need"

2011
 "Juke It" (featuring DJ Gant-Man)

2012
 "Eat God See Acid"
 "Feel It"
 "Funky Vodka"
 "Higher 2.0"
 "Face Melt" (featuring Whiskey Pete)
 "Same Old Fool"
 "Jacked Up Funk" (featuring DJ Dan)
 "Don't Stop the Party" (Pitbull collaborates in this song)
 "Ode to Oi"

2013
 "Don't Hertz Me" (featuring Deth Hertz)
 "What's Up Suckaz"

2014
 "Come Back Down" (featuring Benji Madden)
 "Bounce Generation" (with VINAI)
 "What's That Spell" (with Dillon Francis)
 "Ass Hypnotized" (featuring Dances with White Girls)

2015
 "Buckle Up"
 "Mic Check" (with GTA)
 "How Ya Feelin"
 "Turn the Bass Up"
 "Angry Duck"
 "Polluted" (featuring Dirt Nasty)

2016
 "We Wanna Party" (featuring Savage)
 "Fuck Me Up" (featuring Cardi B)
 "Dik Work" (featuring DJ Funk)
 "Freaks"

2017
 "Rollin'" (x Joel Fletcher)
 "Time to Jack"
 "Higher State" (with Chris Bushnell)
 "Check This" (with Reece Low featuring Fatman Scoop)

Charting singles

Remixes 
 
2007
 Paul Birken - I'm in the Pocket (TJR Mix)
 Johnny Fiasco - Love Is The Message (TJR Remix)
 Hustle and Flow - Don't Mess With Us (TJR Remix)

2008
 CyberSutra - Dope - (TJR's I Hate My Day Job Remix)
 Scratche - Electric Dyslexic (TJR Remix)
 DJ Dan and Donald Glaude - Stick Em (TJR Remix)
 DJ Kue - 40's and Hoes (TJR Remix)
 Chris Anderson - Overdose (TJR Remix)

2009
 Aniki and Bling Fingah - Cut The Mix (Hot Mouth and TJR Remix)
 Armand van Helden - Boogie Monster (TJR Remix)
 Cold Blank - Breakdown (TJR Remix)
 Robb G - Chasing Trouble (TJR Remix)
 Paul Anthony and ZXX - Let Me Bang (Hot Mouth and TJR Remix)

2010
 Lonely Hearts Club - Apocalypse (TJR Remix)
 LA Riots - The Drop (TJR Remix)

2011
 Viro and Rob Analyze featuring Whiskey Pete - Limelight (TJR's Let's Ride Vocalized Remix)
 Mightyfools - World Tour (TJR Remix)
 Surecut Kids and Cheasleauen - Drunk In This (TJR Vox Remix)
 TJR - Booty Move (TJR Remake)
 TJR featuring DJ Gant-Man - Juke It (TJR For The Heads Remix)
 WhiteNoize - The Underground (TJR Remix)
 Chris Lake and Nightriders - NYC (TJR's Moar Cowbell Remix)
 Diamond Lights - Have My Way (TJR Remix)
 Chuckie and Gregor Salto - What Happens In Vegas (TJR Remix)
 Too Fresh and Marvell - Hotel Party (TJR Remix)

2012
 Warehouse featuring Amy B - You and Me Tonight (TJR Remix)
 Chris Arnott featuring Daddy Long Legs - Let Go (TJR Remix)
 Danny T featuring Oh Snap - Delicious (TJR Remix)
 Diamond Lights and Talisha Karrer - Good Love (TJR Remix)
 Crookers - Massive (TJR and Anthony Wolf Remix)
 TJR featuring Whiskey Pete - Face Melt (TJR Remix)
 Robbie Rivera featuring Wynter Gordon - In The Morning (TJR Remix)
 Baauer - Harlem Shake (TJR House Fix)
 Thomas Bangalter - Ventura (TJR Refix)

2013
 Will Sparks - Ah Yeah! (TJR Remix)

2014
 Jason Derulo featuring 2 Chainz - Talk Dirty (TJR Remix)
 Elliphant featuring Skrillex - Only Getting Younger (TJR Remix)
 Jack Ü featuring Kiesza - Take U There (TJR Remix)

2015
 Crookers featuring Jeremih - I Just Can't (TJR Remix)
 TJR featuring Dances With White Girls - Ass Hypnotized (TJR Booty Remix)
 Wale - Girls On Drugs (TJR Remix)

2016
 DJ Snake - Propaganda (TJR and Nom De Strip Remix)
 Major Lazer - Too Original (TJR Remix)
 Pitbull featuring Flo Rida and LunchMoney Lewis - Green Light (TJR Remix)

References

Notes
 A  Did not enter the Ultratop 50, but peaked on the Ultratip chart.
 B  Did not enter the Ultratop 50, but peaked on the Dance Bubbling Under chart.

Sources

External links 
 

1983 births
Living people
American dance musicians
American DJs
Record producers from Connecticut
Remixers
Electronic dance music DJs